Tor-Arne Fredheim (born 5 November 1962) is a Swedish football manager and former player.

Career
A midfielder, Fredheim started out his playing career in hometown club Hallstahammars SK before moving to IFK Norrköping where he played for eight seasons and won the Swedish championship.

Manager career
He was appointed manager as the manager of FC Trollhättan on 25 November 2016.

Honours

Club
IFK Norrköping
Swedish champions: 1989

References

External links
 Tor-Arne Fredheim at Soccerway

1962 births
Living people
Association football midfielders
Swedish footballers
IFK Norrköping players
Allsvenskan players
Swedish football managers
IFK Norrköping managers
Ljungskile SK managers
Assyriska FF managers
Västerås SK Fotboll managers
Åtvidabergs FF managers